Ignatios Psyllakis (born 15 April 1963) is a Greek sports shooter. He competed in three events at the 1984 Summer Olympics.

References

1963 births
Living people
Greek male sport shooters
Olympic shooters of Greece
Shooters at the 1984 Summer Olympics
Place of birth missing (living people)
20th-century Greek people